Dendragama is a genus of lizards in the family Agamidae. The genus is endemic to the Barisan Mountains in Sumatra (Indonesia) and is typically found at altitudes above . Populations of Dendragama (Squamata:Agamidae and Salea Rosaceum Thominot)  were discovered at the northern and southern ends of Sumatra. High genetic distances and concordance of multiple , apparently independent diagnostic characters support the descriptions of these two populations as new species. These species undergo remarkable color change in response to time of day and stress.

Species
There are four recognized species:
Dendragama australis Harvey, Shaney, Sidik, Kurniawan, & Smith, 2017
Dendragama boulengeri (Doria, 1888) – Boulenger's tree agama
Dendragama dioidema Harvey, Shaney, Sidik, Kurniawan, & Smith, 2017
Dendragama schneideri Ahl, 1926 – Schneider's tree agama

References

Dendragama
Lizard genera
Taxa named by Giacomo Doria
Endemic fauna of Sumatra